Meray Qatil Meray Dildar also written as Mere Qatil Mere Dildar  is a Pakistani teledrama broadcast on Hum TV. It premiered on 9 October 2011 and ended its run on 8 April 2012.

At the annual Hum Awards, the series received ten nominations.

Plot
The story revolves around Maham, a young lady in her 20s. She is madly in love with Umer, who loves her back. Umar's family does not approve of this relationship. But the young lovers finally get married after Umar's elder brother persuades them to give their consent. But after the marriage Maham has to face her in-laws which consisting of Umar's father, his elder brother Bakhtyar, Bakhtyar's wife Rubab, Umar's paternal aunt Durdaana and  her daughter Shifa. After Maham meets Bakhtyar she gets to know that he was the man who had been stalking her for quite a long time. On the other hand, Durdhaana had wanted Umar to marry Shifa. To take revenge Durdaana starts hatching plots against Maham so that all the family members turn against the young bride. But never for once does Umar speaks against Durdaana even if he knows that she is wrong and is lying. Meanwhile, Bakhtyar keeps on stalking Maham and threatens her that if she informs anyone about this then he will get her into big trouble.

A year later Umar's father finally asks Umar to marry Shifa and take her as a second wife, after requests from Durdaana's side. But Umar disagrees and asserts that he may leave his entire family for Maham; after this his father suffers a heart attack and dies. Now Bakhtyar being the head of the family exercises his authority and keeps on misbehaving with Maham. Umer who blindly believes his brother is just a puppet in his hands. Neither Maham nor Rubab dare speak out. When Bakhtyar is caught red handed trying to harass Maham he succeeds in putting the entire blame on her. Umar ends up divorcing Maham. Once she is gone the family convinces Umar to marry Shifa and he complies, even though he does not love her. Later to take revenge, Maham marries Bakhtyar. One by one Maham avenges all her insults. Durdaana and Shifa find themselves at the receiving end. Maham even manages to convince the infatuated Bakhtyar to transfer his family home in her name. Meanwhile, Umar is deeply disturbed by the sight of Maham as his brother's wife.

In the end, Umar overhears Bakhtyar and Durdaana talking about how an innocent Maham had become the victim of their conspiracies. Filled with remorse Umar rushes to apologise to Maham and begs her for another chance but she does not respond. He divorces Shifa and leaves her, along with Durdaana, in a dilapidated old house.  Shifa goes insane and Durdaana is left lamenting her bad luck. Meanwhile, Maham vanishes, leaving behind a letter in which she explains to Bakhtyar what she had done and why. Bakhtyar goes berserk trying to find her and dies after meeting an accident. Rubab inherits the entire wealth and takes charge. Umar decides to go away to London, hoping against hope that he might meet Maham one day and beg for her forgiveness.

Cast
 Mehwish Hayat as Maham
 Ahsan Khan as Umer
 Adnan Siddiqui as Bakhtyar
 Semra Zubair as Rubab
 Shagufta Ejaz as Durdhaana Phoopoo
 Sajal Aly as Shifa
 Qavi Khan as Umar's father
 Badar Khalil as Maham's mother
 Farhan Ali Agha as Ayaz (Maham's elder brother)
 Madiha Rizvi as Faria (Maham's sister-in-law and Ayaz's wife)
 Affan Waheed as Rehaan (Maham's brother)
 Aasma Jahangir Khan as Sana (Maham's friend and Rehaan's wife)
 Zaheen Tahira as Sana's paternal grandmother

International broadcast 
In UK and Ireland, the show was broadcast by a number of channels e.g, Colors TV UK, Rishtey and on Hum Europe.
In Arab countries, the show was dubbed in Arabic and aired on MBC 4.
In Mauritius, the show was broadcast by MBC Network Mauritius Broadcasting Corporation

In India, the show was huge popular where it first aired on 5 August 2014 on Zindagi. The show started running again in India from 27 July. It ended on 30 August 2014. The show had garnered popular responses from viewers. On account of the response from Indian viewers, the show was successfully re-run, on 7 December 2014 and later as a marathon re-run.

The show is also available on Indian OTT platform ZEE5 to stream online in more than 190 countries.

Lux Style Awards
 Best TV Actor (Satellite)-Adnan Siddiqui-Nominated
 Best TV Actress (Satellite)-Mehwish Hayat-Nominated

References

External links 
 
 Official website

2011 Pakistani television series debuts
Pakistani drama television series
Hum TV original programming
2012 Pakistani television series endings
Urdu-language telenovelas
Pakistani telenovelas
Zee Zindagi original programming